Acacia obtriangularis, also commonly knowns as Lawley River wattle, is a shrub of the genus Acacia and the subgenus Plurinerves that is endemic to a small area of north western Australia.

Description
Like most species of Acacia it has phyllodes rather than true leaves. It blooms around March or April producing yellow flowers.

Taxonomy
The species was first formally described by the botanists Bruce Maslin, Matthew David Barrett and Russell Lindsay Barrett in 2013 as a part of the work A baker's dozen of new wattles highlights significant Acacia (Fabaceae: Mimosoideae) diversity and endemism in the north-west Kimberley region of Western Australia as published in the journal Nuytsia.
It is a part of the larger Acacia deltoidea group but is easily distinguished from other members by virtue of its spicate inflorescences and is most closely related to Acacia froggattii and Acacia vincentii.

Distribution
It is native to a small area in the Kimberley region of Western Australia. It is found as part of a single population that covers an area of several square kilometres near the mouth of the Lawley River where it is found growing in sandy soils over sheets of sandstone.

See also
 List of Acacia species

References

obtriangularis
Acacias of Western Australia
Taxa named by Russell Lindsay Barrett
Taxa named by Bruce Maslin
Taxa named by Matthew David Barrett
Plants described in 2013